2006 Zurich Open was a Tier I women's tennis event on the 2006 WTA Tour.

Finals

Singles

 Maria Sharapova defeated  Daniela Hantuchová, 6–1, 4–6, 6–3

Doubles

 Cara Black /  Rennae Stubbs defeated  Liezel Huber /  Katarina Srebotnik, 7–5, 7–5

External links
Official website 
WTA draws

Zurich Open
Zurich Open
2006 in Swiss tennis
2006 in Swiss women's sport